Walter Jackson Bate (May 23, 1918 – July 26, 1999) was an American literary critic and biographer. He is known for Pulitzer Prize for Biography or Autobiography-winning biographies of Samuel Johnson (1978) and John Keats (1964). 
Samuel Johnson also won the 1978 U.S. National Book Award  in Biography.

Bate was born in Mankato, Minnesota. He studied (under Douglas Bush) and later taught at Harvard University.

His critical work, especially The Burden of the Past and the English Poet, responds to and anticipates some aspects of the work of Harold Bloom. His biographies of Keats and Johnson have enjoyed extraordinary reputations both as scholarly resources and as works of literature in their own right. Jane Kenyon, one of many writers to be influenced by the Keats biography, paraphrases it in her poem "Reading Late of the Death of Keats":

Clearly I had packed the wrong bookin my haste: Keats died, propped upto get more air. Severnstraightened the body on the bed,and cut three dampened curlsfrom Keats's head.

He was elected a Fellow of the American Academy of Arts and Sciences in 1957 and a member of the American Philosophical Society in 1966. Bate retired from teaching at Harvard in 1986, and died on July 26, 1999, at Beth Israel Deaconess Medical Center in Boston, aged 81. A brief memoir appeared in 2013.

Major works
Negative Capability: The Intuitive Approach in Keats (1939; reprinted 1976, 2012).
From Classic to Romantic: Premises of Taste in Eighteenth-century England (1946).
Criticism: The Major Texts edited by (1952).
The Achievement of Samuel Johnson (1955).
The Stylistic Development of Keats (1958).
Prefaces to Criticism (1959).
From Classic to Romantic: Premises of Taste in Eighteenth-century England (1961).
John Keats (1963).
Keats: A Collection of Critical Essays (1964).
Coleridge (1968).
The Burden of the Past and the English Poet (1970).
Samuel Johnson (1977).

References

External links
Extensive biography from the Harvard University Gazette.
 

1918 births
1999 deaths
20th-century American biographers
American male biographers
American literary critics
Fellows of the American Academy of Arts and Sciences
National Book Award winners
Pulitzer Prize for Biography or Autobiography winners
Harvard University faculty
People from Mankato, Minnesota
20th-century American non-fiction writers
Harvard University alumni
20th-century American male writers
Members of the American Philosophical Society